Estela De Covadonga García Villalta  (born 20 March 1989) is a Spanish sprinter. She competed in the 100 metres and 200 metres at the 2016 European Athletics Championships. García was suspended for 2 years in 2011 after testing positive for a diuretic.

International competitions

Personal bests
Outdoor
100 metres – 11.30 (+1.4 m/s, Madrid 2018)
200 metres – 23.11 (+0.5 m/s, Tarragona 2018)
300 metres – 37.30 (Barcelona 2018)
Indoor
60 metres – 7.41 (Madrid 2016)
200 metres – 23.77 (Sabadell 2013)

References

External links
 

1989 births
Living people
Spanish female sprinters
Athletes from Catalonia
People from Vilanova i la Geltrú
Sportspeople from the Province of Barcelona
Athletes (track and field) at the 2016 Summer Olympics
Olympic athletes of Spain
Doping cases in athletics
Spanish sportspeople in doping cases
Mediterranean Games silver medalists for Spain
Mediterranean Games bronze medalists for Spain
Mediterranean Games medalists in athletics
Athletes (track and field) at the 2009 Mediterranean Games
Athletes (track and field) at the 2013 Mediterranean Games
Athletes (track and field) at the 2018 Mediterranean Games
European Games competitors for Spain
Athletes (track and field) at the 2019 European Games
Olympic female sprinters
21st-century Spanish women